Ian Cameron may refer to:

 Ian Cameron (footballer, born 1966), Scottish football player and coach
 Ian Cameron (footballer, born 1988), Scottish football player and coach
 Ian Cameron (politician) (born 1938), Australian retired politician
 Ian Cameron (stockbroker) (1932–2010), father of former British prime minister David Cameron
 Ian Cameron (musician), Canadian fiddler and composer
 Ian Cameron, pen name of English author Donald G. Payne (born 1924)
 Ian O. Cameron, ABC News producer and husband of Susan Rice

See also
 Eoin Cameron (1951–2016), Australian radio presenter and former politician
Iain Cameron (disambiguation)